Patrick Faijdherbe (born 25 May 1973) is a Dutch former basketball player and current coach. He served as a head coach for Apollo Amsterdam of the Dutch Basketball League (DBL) for five seasons.

Coaching career 
In the summer of 2015, Faijdherbe was announced as the new head coach of Apollo Amsterdam of the Dutch Basketball League. After the 2019–20 season, Faijdherbe stopped after 5 seasons with Apollo.

References

1973 births
Living people
Dutch basketball coaches
Apollo Amsterdam coaches
BSC Fürstenfeld Panthers players
Donar (basketball club) players
Matrixx Magixx players
Apollo Amsterdam players
Amsterdam Basketball players